Toomsuba is a census-designated place (CDP) and unincorporated community in Lauderdale County, Mississippi, United States. Its population was 778 as of the 2020 census. Its ZIP code is 39364.

The community is named after Toomsuba Creek.

Geography
U.S. Routes 80 and 11 pass through the community as its main street. Interstate Highways 20 and 59 run along the southern edge of the community, with access from Exit 165 (Will Garrett Road). I-20 and I-59 lead west to Meridian and northeast  to Tuscaloosa, Alabama, while U.S. Route 11 and 80 lead west to Meridian and east  to their split near Cuba, Alabama.

In addition to the Toomsuba town center at the crossroads of US 11/80 with Will Garrett Road and Lauderdale–Toomsuba Road, the CDP contains residential development around Bailey Lake, a reservoir just west of the town center.

Demographics

As of the 2020 United States census, there were 778 people, 300 households, and 194 families residing in the CDP.

Notable people
 Norman Robinson, former New Orleans journalist
 Jack Spinks, former National Football League fullback and partial namesake of Casem-Spinks Stadium, the home stadium of the Alcorn State Braves
 Richard E. Thompson, member of the Mississippi State Senate from 1916 to 1920
 John A. Yeager, member of the Mississippi House of Representatives from 1916 to 1932

Notes

Census-designated places in Lauderdale County, Mississippi
Unincorporated communities in Mississippi
Census-designated places in Mississippi
Unincorporated communities in Lauderdale County, Mississippi
Census-designated places in Meridian micropolitan area
Mississippi placenames of Native American origin